Amrani or El Amrani (Lamrani) is an Arabic surname literally meaning "from Amran". Notable people with the surname include:

Amrani
Ahlam Amrani
Abdelkader Amrani
 Abderrahmane Amrani
Djamel Amrani
Farida Amrani
Mosab Amrani
Yasmina Amrani
Yossi Amrani
Youssef Amrani
Zakaria Amrani

El Amrani
Ahmed El Amrani
Hicham El Amrani
Hicham El Amrani (sports executive)
Issandr El Amrani
Mohammed bin Ismail Al Amrani
Reda El Amrani
Wafaa Lamrani
Mohammed Karim Lamrani

Arabic-language surnames